Qaraçinar is a village and municipality in the Goranboy District of Azerbaijan. It has a population of 816. The municipality consists of the villages of Qaraçinar, Qaxtut, and Yenikənd. The village had an Armenian majority prior to the First Nagorno-Karabakh War and Operation Ring.

Notable people 
 Georgi Vanyan

References

External links 
 

Populated places in Goranboy District